Pierre Repellini (born 27 October 1950 in Hyères, Var) is a French former football striker and manager. He is a historic player of AS Saint-Etienne, and won many trophies with les Verts before ending his career in his native town of Hyères with Hyères FC. He later had a stints as a coach at Red Star FC and AS Saint-Etienne.

Titles
As a player
French championship in 1970, 1974, 1975, 1976 with AS Saint-Étienne
Coupe de France 1974, 1975, and 1977 with AS Saint-Étienne
European Cup runner-up in  1976 with AS Saint-Étienne

External links
 Profile
 Profile
 

1950 births
Living people
Sportspeople from Hyères
French footballers
France international footballers
Association football defenders
AS Saint-Étienne players
French football managers
Red Star F.C. managers
AS Saint-Étienne managers
French people of Italian descent
Footballers from Provence-Alpes-Côte d'Azur